Pascal Nemirovski (born 1962) is a French pianist. In 1981, he was admitted to the Juilliard School on full scholarship (Steinway & Freundlich Fund) and studied with Nadia Reisenberg, pupil of Josef Hofmann and Adele Marcus, pupil of Josef Lhevinne.

As a pedagogue, he enjoys an international reputation for presenting master classes throughout the world and is often a jury member at international piano competitions. His students include celebrated pianists Lise de la Salle and Louis Schwizgebel.

From 2006 to 2016, he taught at the Royal Academy of Music in London, where in 2009, he was awarded an Honorary Associate of the Royal Academy of Music (ARAM). In 2012, he also became a teacher for the Academy's LRAM teaching diploma. Since 2011, he has taught at The Purcell School. In 2015, he was appointed Guest Professor at the Royal Birmingham Conservatoire, becoming a professor and International Chair in Piano in September 2016. He is currently a Visiting Professor at the Shanghai and Guangzhou Conservatories in China.

He also teaches at several summer music festivals, including the Edwin Fischer Sommerakademie (Germany), MusicAlp (France), Music Fest Perugia (Italy), and the Cadenza Summer School (UK). He was appointed Artistic Director and Chairman of the Jury of the Concours International de Piano Antoine de Saint-Exupéry (Saint-Priest/Lyon, France) from 2017 to 2021. In 2023, He is appointed Artistic Director and Chairman of the Madrid International Piano Competition.
Pascal Nemirovski is a Steinway Artist.

References

External links
Official site of Pascal Nemirovski
Official site of Madrid International Piano Competition
Genealogy on Pianists Corner

21st-century French male classical pianists
1962 births
Academics of the Royal Academy of Music
Piano pedagogues
Living people
Juilliard School alumni